Jamaica competed at the 1976 Summer Olympics in Montreal, Quebec, Canada. 20 competitors, 11 men and 9 women, took part in 18 events in 3 sports.

Medalists

Gold
 Don Quarrie — Athletics, Men's 200 metres

Silver
 Don Quarrie — Athletics, Men's 100 metres

Athletics

Men's 800 metres
 Seymour Newman
 Heat — 1:48.46
 Semi Final — 1:47.22 (→ did not advance)

Men's 4 × 400 m Relay 
 Leighton Priestley, Donald Quarrie, Colin Bradford, and Seymour Newman
 Heat — 3:03.86
 Final — 3:02.84 (→ 5th place)

Boxing

Cycling

Three cyclists represented Jamaica in 1976.

Individual road race
 Errol Walters — did not finish (→ no ranking)

Sprint
 Xavier Mirander — 16th place

1000m time trial
 David Weller — 1:08.534 (→ 11th place)

References

External links
Official Olympic Reports
International Olympic Committee results database

Nations at the 1976 Summer Olympics
1976 Summer Olympics
1976 in Jamaican sport